is a park in Yokohama, Kanagawa Prefecture, Japan.

External links
 

Tourist attractions in Yokohama
Parks and gardens in Yokohama
Minato Mirai 21